Was She Guilty? (1922) is a British-Dutch silent crime film directed by George Beranger. It is also known by the alternative title of Thou Shalt Not.

Cast
 Gertrude McCoy as Ruth Herwood  
 Zoe Palmer as Mary (17 years)  
 Louis Willoughby as George Midhurst, lawyer  
 William Freshman as Bobby (19 years) 
 Pierre Balledux as Ling Soo  
 Paul de Groot as John Herwood 
 Norman Doxat-Pratt as Bobby (5 years)  
 Fred Homann 
 Kitty Kluppell as Palmyra Hawks  
 Joan Midwinter as Mary (3 years)  
 Mari van Warmelo as The Parson

External links 
 

1922 films
British silent feature films
Dutch silent feature films
British black-and-white films
Dutch black-and-white films
1922 crime films
Films directed by George Beranger
British crime films
Dutch crime films
1920s British films